The Aesculapian Club has had many notable former members. The following sections give a list of former members of the Club in chronological order of their year of election.

1770's 

There are two individuals called James Lind who were Fellows of the Royal College of Physicians of Edinburgh at this time. The older James Lind was born in 1716 and is most famous for conducting research into the cause and treatment of scurvy. His younger cousin James Lind was born in 1736 and was a physician with interests in natural sciences and botany. He was a similar age to the other founding members making it more likely that he was the Aesculapian. Aesculapian Lind resigned membership of the club after only 11 months in March 1774. In 1774, the younger James Lind is known to have failed to secure a professorship in Edinburgh. Dr Andrew Duncan 'The Elder' and Daniel Rutherford were also applicants.

1780's

1790's 

There is no record of a William Harkness being a Fellow of the Royal College of Surgeons of Edinburgh, but a Walter Harkness became a Fellow in 1792.  There are two Fellows of the Royal College of surgeons named James Anderson from this era – one who became a Fellow on 1 December 1795 and the other on 14 November 1797. There are two original papers from this era authored by a surgeon called James Anderson. There is no record that William Greenfield was a Fellow of either the Royal College of Surgeons of Edinburgh or the Royal College of Physicians of Edinburgh. It appears that Thomas Wood was re-elected to the Club in 1796 having resigned membership in 1784.

1800's

1810's 

There is no record of John Allan being a Fellow of the Royal College of Surgeons of Edinburgh. He became a Member of the Royal College of Surgeons of England in 1811 and became a mate on an 'Indiaman' sailing ship in that same year. John Allan and John Barclay were both elected to the Aesculapian Club on 6 May 1810; Allan's publication from 1825 was 'communicated' by John Barclay.

1820's

1830's

1840's 

The Aesculapian Club photograph album entry for Charles Bell erroneously includes a copy of the portrait of Sir Charles Bell, whose name is given to unilateral paralysis of the facial nerve (Bell's palsy). Sir Charles Bell died in 1842 and was not a member of the Aesculapian Club. Aesculapian Charles Bell was the nephew of Sir Charles Bell and the younger brother of Aesculapian George Hamilton Bell.l

1850's

1860's

1870's

1880's

1890's 

In March 1895 Dr Alexander Peddie was elected a member of the club. His photograph was added to the Club album and his name was included in printed list of members for that year. However, he did not attend any dinners  and the minutes from October 1895 record that after due consideration Dr Peddie had declined to become a member. In December 1895 Dr Francis Cadell was elected in his place. Cadell was a surgeon and father of the Scottish Colourist Francis Cadell.

1900's

1910's

1920's

1930's

1940's

1950's

1960's

1970's 

James Thomson was appointed a consultant surgeon at the Royal Infirmary of Edinburgh in 1964.

1980's

1990's

2000's

References 

Organizations established in 1773
Clubs and societies in Edinburgh
Organisations based in Edinburgh